Davok Ó Con Ceanainn, Lord of Uí Díarmata, fl. 1478.

Biography

Davock was an Irish Lord.  He succeeded his father, William, but was banished into Connemara before the end of the year. His descendants adopted the surname Mac Davock or Mac Davy and are still found in the area. His successor seems to be unknown.

References

 The Story of the Concannons, Maureen Concannon O'Brien, Clan Publications, Dublin, c.1995.
 The Tribes and Customs of Hy-Many, John O'Donovan, 1843
 The Parish of Ballinasloe, Fr. Jerome A. Fahey.
 The Great Book of Irish Genealogies, 239.11, 244.2, pp. 556–557, volume one, Dubhaltach MacFhirbhisigh; edited, with translation and indices by Nollaig Ó Muraíle, 2003-2004. .
 https://www.webcitation.org/query?url=http://www.geocities.com/Athens/Aegean/2444/irish/LD.htm&date=2009-10-25+05:47:51
 Annals of Ulster at CELT: Corpus of Electronic Texts at University College Cork
 Annals of Tigernach at CELT: Corpus of Electronic Texts at University College Cork
Revised edition of McCarthy's synchronisms at Trinity College Dublin.

People from County Galway
Medieval Gaels from Ireland
15th-century Irish people
Irish lords